Dejan Jakovic (born 16 July 1985) is a Canadian soccer player who plays as a centre-back for the Serbian White Eagles. Internationally, he represented the Canada national team from 2008 to 2018.

Early life and career
Born in Karlovac, SR Croatia prior to the breakup of Yugoslavia, Jakovic was brought by his parents to Canada at the age of six following the outbreak of war in 1991. They settled in Etobicoke, part of Metropolitan Toronto. His father Nenad played for NK Karlovac in Croatia.

Jakovic took up association football in Canada. He was a four-year letterwinner at Scarlett Heights Academy, and was named team MVP as a junior and senior, captaining both indoor and outdoor teams. He played in the Canada national youth program, and also for two-time Ontario Cup winner Woodbridge Strikers under Bob Graham. He was a member of the team that competed at the 2004 Dallas Cup, played with former UAB teammate Lukasz Kwapisz.

At the age of eighteen, Jakovic had a trial with OFK Beograd, but was not signed by the team.

College
After failing to make the OFK squad, Jakovic accepted a scholarship to the University of Alabama at Birmingham and went on to play four years of college soccer for the Blazers.

In 2007, he played with the Canadian Lions of the Canadian Soccer League where he was selected for the Locust CSL All Star game.

Club career

Red Star Belgrade
On 28 June 2008, soon to be twenty-three-year-old Jakovic joined Red Star Belgrade ahead of the 2008–09 season, after successfully completing a tryout with the team. He officially signed with the club on 30 June 2008.

Jakovic made three league starts at the beginning of the season under head coach Zdeněk Zeman. However, following a coaching change on 6 September 2008, Dejan lost his spot in the team and failed to register a single league appearance following the appointment of new head coach Čedomir Janevski.

At the 2008-09 winter break, Red Star began looking at options to move Jakovic. In December 2008 it was reported he would be sent to FK Rad along with Marko Blažić, another player who started under Zeman but had played sparsely since Janevski took over, as part of a deal to bring defender Nemanja Pejčinović to Red Star. However, by February 2009, no trade had been announced by the teams, and Jakovic was still on the list Red Star players that started preparations for second half of the season.

D.C. United

Jakovic signed for Major League Soccer side D.C. United on 27 February 2009. Jakovic scored his first goal for the club on 26 May 2012 against New England Revolution, the game ended in a 3–2 home victory. Jakovic signed a contract extension with D.C. United following the 2012 season.

Shimizu S-Pulse
Jakovic signed with Japanese club Shimizu S-Pulse on 14 January 2014. Jakovic was released by Shimizu S-Pulse on 5 February 2017.

New York Cosmos
In March 2017, Jakovic signed with North American Soccer League club New York Cosmos.

Los Angeles FC
Jakovic returned to the top flight when he signed with MLS expansion club Los Angeles FC in January 2018. Jaokvic would make his LAFC debut against the Seattle Sounders during the 2018 season opener. He re-signed with Los Angeles in January 2019 ahead of the 2019 MLS season.

He moved on loan to Las Vegas Lights on 7 June 2019. He was recalled three weeks later on the 28th. Jakovic's option for the 2020 season was declined by Los Angeles, but he signed a new contract with the club in December 2019.

Forge FC
On 13 May 2021, Jakovic signed with defending Canadian Premier League champions Forge FC. He left the club after one season.

Serbian White Eagles 
Jakovic returned to the Canadian Soccer League for the 2022 season to sign with the Serbian White Eagles. He made his debut on June 26, 2022, against the Toronto Falcons. He helped the Serbs in securing the regular-season title including a playoff berth. In the second round of the postseason Jakovic served as the team captain where the Serbs were eliminated from the competition after a defeat to FC Continentals.

International career
Jakovic made his debut for the senior Canadian men's soccer team on 30 January 2008 against Martinique. Later in 2008, he earned five caps for the Canada U-23 squad in the 2008 CONCACAF Men's Pre-Olympic Tournament, during which Canada finished third, one place out of qualification. Jakovic was also chosen in the 23-man roster for the 2009 CONCACAF Gold Cup; Canada won Group A with 7 points before being knocked out by Honduras in the quarter-finals.

Jakovic was selected for the 2011 CONCACAF Gold Cup, however sustained a hamstring injury a week prior to the group stage in a friendly at BMO Field against Ecuador the match ended 2–2. David Edgar was selected on 6 June to replace Jakovic in the 23-man squad for the CONCACAF tournament.

Career statistics

Honours
D.C. United
  Lamar Hunt U.S. Open Cup (1): 2013

References

External links

Profile at UAB official athletic website

1985 births
Living people
Sportspeople from Karlovac
Canadian soccer players
Canada men's under-23 international soccer players
Canada men's international soccer players
Serbian footballers
Canadian people of Serbian descent
Naturalized citizens of Canada
Serbs of Croatia
Yugoslav emigrants to Canada
Sportspeople from Etobicoke
Soccer players from Toronto
Association football defenders
Association football midfielders
2009 CONCACAF Gold Cup players
2015 CONCACAF Gold Cup players
2017 CONCACAF Gold Cup players
Canadian expatriate soccer players
Canadian expatriate sportspeople in the United States
Canadian expatriates in Serbia
UAB Blazers men's soccer players
Brampton United players
Red Star Belgrade footballers
D.C. United players
Shimizu S-Pulse players
New York Cosmos (2010) players
Los Angeles FC players
Las Vegas Lights FC players
Forge FC players
Serbian White Eagles FC players
Canadian Soccer League (1998–present) players
Serbian SuperLiga players
Major League Soccer players
J1 League players
J2 League players
USL Championship players
Expatriate soccer players in the United States
Expatriate footballers in Serbia
Expatriate footballers in Japan
University of Alabama at Birmingham alumni
Yugoslav Wars refugees